Sandiaga Salahuddin Uno (born 28 June 1969) is an Indonesian businessman, investor and politician who is the Minister of Tourism and Creative Economy, and was the Deputy Governor of Jakarta. He was elected along with Anies Baswedan in the 2017 Jakarta gubernatorial election after defeating incumbent pair Basuki Tjahaja Purnama (widely known as "Ahok") and Djarot Saiful Hidayat. He resigned the office to run as Prabowo Subianto's running mate for the 2019 Indonesian presidential election.

A graduate of George Washington University, Sandiaga worked for several companies and rose in rank before founding his own business, which led him to become one of the richest people in Indonesia. In 2015, he resigned from his companies to join Gerindra. Upon his candidacy as vice president, he also renounced his membership in Prabowo's Gerindra as part of the deal with coalition parties.

Career

Business 
Sandi Uno graduated from Wichita State University in 1990 and from George Washington University with an MBA in 1992, paid by William Soerjadjaja, because his mother personally knew the Astra International group founder. He began his career with Summa Bank in 1990. In 1994, he joined MP Group Holding Limited as an investment manager. The following year, he began working for NTI Resources Ltd in Canada and worked as an Executive Vice President in the company. The 1997 financial crisis hit NTI Resources Ltd hard and caused it to go into administration, leaving him unemployed.

In 1997, he co-founded PT. Recapital Advisors with his high school friend, Rosan Perkasa Roeslani. the following year, he co-founded Saratoga Capital with Edwin Soeryadjaya, son of William Soerjadjaja. Both businesses continue to flourish today. Listed as 29th richest man in Indonesia according to Forbes magazine in 2009, he continued to grow his businesses, buying a controlling (51%) stake in Mandala Airlines in May 2011. He was listed as 47th richest man in Indonesia according to Forbes in 2013.

In 2016, his name appeared on the list of Panama Papers, although he denies he evaded taxes or broke the law.

Politics 

He decided to leave the business world, entering politics in mid-2015. In the period from April to July 2015, he officially resigned from various positions in 16 subsidiaries of Saratoga and Recapital. Joining the Gerindra party as vice chairman of the board of supervisors, he was catapulted to the second highest office after Prabowo. His name began to be considered by Gerindra to be nominated in the 2017 Jakarta gubernatorial election.

Late in 2015, several volunteer community support groups began to emerge, including "Sahabat Sandiaga Uno" (Friends of Sandiaga Uno or SSU). He began making visits to various locations within Jakarta. In early 2016, Sandiaga Uno, with assistance of his supporters, began to intensify visits to various locations in Jakarta. Performing visits to up to 7 different locations a day, for the 6-month period from February to August 2016. The rumour of his candidacy intensified, as news leaked of the desire of 7 political parties to form a grand coalition in August 2016.

This desire was not realised following the withdrawal the ruling PDI-P party, which threw its weight behind incumbent governor Ahok, along with Golkar, Hanura and Nasdem. The Democratic Party, PAN, PKB and PPP then announced it planned to nominate Agus Harimurti Yudhoyono (son of former President Susilo Bambang Yudhoyono) for the position.

The remaining parties, Gerindra and PKS, agreed to remain in the coalition, selecting former Education Minister Anies Baswedan as their candidate, and Sandiaga Uno as his running mate. Sandi said, he had suggested Baswedan to Prabowo because he felt that Baswedan would be more suitable for the position.

Following victory in the election, which an editorial described as "the most polarizing and most divisive the nation has ever seen in Indonesian political history," and the incarceration of Ahok, he was made deputy governor on 16 October 2017.

In 2018, he was accused of paying opposition parties PAN and PKS Rp 500 billion (US$35 million) each to approve him as Prabowo Subianto's vice presidential candidate for the 2019 presidential election. Regardless, he declared his resignation from his office to participate in the election on 10 August 2018. The resignation was made official on 18 September 2018.

After Prabowo's defeat in the 2019 election, Sandiaga did not hold any office until he was appointed as Minister of Tourism and Creative Economy on 22 December 2020.

Teaching career 
There were multiple reports in Indonesia that Sandiaga Uno was appointed as a "distinguished research professor in residence" at George Washington University. However, he already denied it, claiming that his appointment for the title was for his contribution in entrepreneur researches instead from teaching

Health 

On 7 December 2020, Sandiaga Uno and his wife tested positive for COVID-19.

Controversies

Paradise Papers 
In November 2017 an investigation conducted by the International Consortium of Investigative Journalism cited his name in the list of politicians named in "Paradise Papers" allegations. He was claimed to have own an offshore company named NTI resources, as well as several shell companies in British Virgin Islands. Regarding this, the Indonesian Minister of Finance, Sri Mulyani, vowed to study the legitimacy of the paper, and will take an appropriate measure if there was any wrongdoing conducted.

Program
Even before his appointment to the deputy governorship, Sandiaga proceeded to execute plans mentioned during his campaigning. In early October, an entrepreneurship program dubbed OK OCE (One Kecamatan, One Center for Entrepreneurship), which he had called for during the election, was initiated with his elder brother Indra initially acting as president, although the following day he was replaced due to nepotism concerns.

References

1969 births
Living people
Indonesian Muslims
Indonesian businesspeople
Indonesian billionaires
Indonesian people of Malay descent
Indonesian socialites
People from Pekanbaru
Government ministers of Indonesia
Wichita State University alumni
George Washington University School of Business alumni
People named in the Panama Papers
Vice Governors of Jakarta
Great Indonesia Movement Party politicians
People named in the Paradise Papers
Pelita Harapan University alumni